Chad Rintoul (born 31 July 1974) is a former Australian rules footballer in the Australian Football League.

Adelaide Crows
The midfielder was drafted by the Adelaide Crows in the 1996 AFL Draft from East Fremantle (WAFL) as a mature age recruit. He played 23 games for the Crows, 11 in 1997 including the premiership game, playing as a small forward for most of the year. In 1998 he played 12 games and although he played in the preliminary final, he was dropped the following week so that the Crows could bring in another ruckman and missed out on a second premiership medal. At the end of 1998 he was traded back to Western Australia by the West Coast Eagles for pick 80 which Adelaide used on 26-year-old Brodie Atkinson.

West Coast Eagles
During his first season with the Eagles he played all 24 games including a 36 possession game vs Adelaide. Rintoul couldn't find consistency in 2000 and coach Ken Judge sent Rinoul back to East Fremantle which resulted in him getting delisted.

Collingwood
Rintoul went to Collingwood in the 2001 pre season draft where he was reunited with his former coach Mick Malthouse. Chad was plagued with migraines in 2002 after many concussions and was forced to retire.

Statistics

|-
|- style="background-color: #EAEAEA"
|style="text-align:center;background:#afe6ba;"|1997†
|style="text-align:center;"|
| 42 || 11 || 8 || 11 || 89 || 27 || 116 || 39 || 9 || 0.7 || 1.0 || 8.1 || 2.5 || 10.5 || 3.5 || 0.8
|-
! scope="row" style="text-align:center" | 1998
|style="text-align:center;"|
| 42 || 12 || 8 || 5 || 99 || 45 || 144 || 37 || 12 || 0.7 || 0.4 || 8.3 || 3.8 || 12.0 || 3.1 || 1.0
|- style="background-color: #EAEAEA"
! scope="row" style="text-align:center" | 1999
|style="text-align:center;"|
| 42 || 24 || 6 || 14 || 216 || 133 || 349 || 77 || 23 || 0.3 || 0.6 || 9.0 || 5.5 || 14.5 || 3.2 || 1.0
|-
! scope="row" style="text-align:center" | 2000
|style="text-align:center;"|
| 42 || 15 || 4 || 3 || 136 || 84 || 220 || 54 || 16 || 0.3 || 0.2 || 9.1 || 5.6 || 14.7 || 3.6 || 1.1
|- style="background-color: #EAEAEA"
! scope="row" style="text-align:center" | 2001
|style="text-align:center;"|
| 38 || 11 || 4 || 2 || 94 || 46 || 140 || 46 || 11 || 0.4 || 0.2 || 8.5 || 4.2 || 12.7 || 4.2 || 1.0
|-
! scope="row" style="text-align:center" | 2002
|style="text-align:center;"|
| 21 || 3 || 1 || 2 || 35 || 12 || 47 || 14 || 5 || 0.3 || 0.7 || 11.7 || 4.0 || 15.7 || 4.7 || 1.7
|- class="sortbottom"
! colspan=3| Career
! 76
! 31
! 37
! 669
! 347
! 1016
! 267
! 76
! 0.4
! 0.5
! 8.8
! 4.6
! 13.4
! 3.5
! 1.0
|}

References

External links
 
 

1974 births
Living people
Collingwood Football Club players
Adelaide Football Club players
Adelaide Football Club Premiership players
West Coast Eagles players
East Fremantle Football Club players
Australian rules footballers from Western Australia
One-time VFL/AFL Premiership players